The Men's Pole Vault event at the 2011 World Championships in Athletics was held at the Daegu Stadium on August 27 and 29.

Defending champion and Olympic champion Steven Hooker came into the meet injured.  He was not able to clear his opening height in the trials.

In the final, with three competitors already over 5.85 (including countryman Łukasz Michalski), Paweł Wojciechowski strategically passed his remaining attempts.  At 5.90, he cleared on his second (and last remaining) attempt for the win.  Lázaro Borges also cleared 5.90, but on his third attempt, setting the national record for Cuba in the process.  Renaud Lavillenie edged Michalski for the bronze, because Michalski had a miss at 5.75.

Medalists

Records

Qualification standards

Schedule

Results

Qualification
Qualification: Qualifying Performance 5.70 (Q) or at least 12 best performers (q) advance to the final.

Final

External links
Pole vault results at IAAF website

Pole vault
Pole vault at the World Athletics Championships